| tries = {{#expr:
 +  8 +  4 +  7 +  6 +  2 +  7
 +  3 + 11 +  7 +  4 +  3 +  5
 +  4 +  7 +  5 +  7 +  5 +  5
 +  7 +  2 +  7 +  7 +  4 +  6
 +  3 +  7 +  1 +  4 +  5 +  6
 +  2 +  3 +  8 +  5 +  7 +  5
 +  3 +  5 +  6 +  4 +  0 + 12
 +  1 +  2 +  5 +  5 +  6 +  5
 +  4 +  1 +  1 +  2 +  9 +  3
+  3 +  1 + 12 +  6 +  4 +  5
+  3 +  6 +  8 +  6 +  6 +  5
+  9 +  2 +  5 +  2 +  6 +  5
+  5 +  3 +  9 +  4 +  7 +  6
+  0 +  2 +  8 + 10 +  6 +  4
+  6 +  3 +  7 +  4 +  3 +  0
+  4 + 10 +  4 +  4 +  1 +  7
+  0 + 13 +  4 +  6 +  4 +  3
+ 10 +  3 +  5 +  6 +  2 +  7
+  5 +  6 +  3 +  4 +  8 +  6
+  7 +  7 +  9 +  8 +  3 +  5
+  6 +  8 +  5 +  6 +  3 +  5
+ 11 +  9 +  3 + 10 + 12 +  7
+  4 +  8 +  4
}}
| top point scorer = Andy Goode (Wasps)(240 points)
| top try scorer = Thomas Waldrom (Exeter)(16 tries)
| website    = www.premiershiprugby.com
| prevseason = 2013–14
| nextseason = 2015–16
}}

The 2014–15 Aviva Premiership was the 28th season of the top flight English domestic rugby union competition and the fifth one to be sponsored by Aviva. The reigning champions entering the season were Northampton Saints, who had claimed their first title after defeating Saracens in the 2014 final. London Welsh had been promoted as champions from the 2013–14 RFU Championship at the first attempt.

The competition was broadcast by BT Sport for the second successive season. Highlights of each weekend's games were shown on ITV.

Summary
Saracens won their second title after defeating Bath in the final at Twickenham after having finished fourth in the regular season table. London Welsh were relegated after losing all of their games. It was the second time that London Welsh have been relegated from the top flight since the leagues began and the first time since the 2012–13 Premiership Rugby season.

As usual, round 1 included the London Double Header at Twickenham, the eleventh instance since its inception in 2004.

Teams
Twelve teams compete in the league – the top eleven teams from the previous season and London Welsh who were promoted from the 2013–14 RFU Championship after a top flight absence of one year. They replaced Worcester Warriors who were relegated after three years in the top flight.

Stadiums and locations

Pre-season
The Premiership Rugby Sevens Series continued with the 2014 edition. In a change to the format, the series was expanded to include the four Welsh Regions. As a result, the series began on 26 July 2014, at the BT Sport Cardiff Arms Park, continuing at Kingsholm, Franklin's Gardens and Kingston Park on 31 July, 1 August and 2 August 2014 respectively. The finals were on 8 August 2014 at the Twickenham Stoop. This was the first opportunity of the season for any of the teams competing in the Premiership to win a trophy.

Gloucester won the series for the second year in the row, beating Newport Gwent Dragons 12–5 in the final to become the first team to retain the title. As Gloucester have already qualified for the World Club 7s at Twickenham, the place allocated to the winner of the final was given to Harlequins, as the next best performing English club.

Table

Regular season
Fixtures for the season were announced by Premiership Rugby on 4 July and, as with previous seasons, Round 1 included the annual London Double Header. Fixtures as per Premiership Rugby Match Centre. All matches following Round 9 were subject to change depending on the television picks for a given round.

Round 1

Round 2

Round 3

Round 4

Round 5

Round 6

Round 7

Round 8

Round 9

Round 10

Round 11

Round 12

Round 13

Round 14

Round 15

Round 16

Round 17

Round 18

 This match set a world record for attendance at a domestic club rugby match. This record was broken at the 2016 Top 14 final at Camp Nou in Barcelona, which drew 99,124.

Round 19

Round 20

Round 21

Round 22

Play-offs
As in previous seasons, the top four teams in the Premiership table, following the conclusion of the regular season, contest the play-off semi-finals in a 1st vs 4th and 2nd vs 3rd format, with the higher ranking team having home advantage. The two winners of the semi-finals then meet in the Premiership Final at Twickenham on 30 May 2015.

Bracket

Semi-finals

Final

Leading scorers
Note: Flags indicate national union as has been defined under WR eligibility rules. Players may hold more than one non-WR nationality.

Most points
Source:

Most tries
Source:

Season attendances

By club

Source:

Notes

References

External links

 
2014-15
 
England